Zhang Yiwei (born 3 October 1992) is a Chinese snowboarder. He is a participant at the 2014 Winter Olympics in Sochi.

In early 2015, Zhang Yiwei landed the first triple cork ever in a half-pipe.

References

1992 births
Snowboarders at the 2014 Winter Olympics
Snowboarders at the 2018 Winter Olympics
Living people
Olympic snowboarders of China
Chinese male snowboarders
Asian Games medalists in snowboarding
Snowboarders at the 2007 Asian Winter Games
Snowboarders at the 2017 Asian Winter Games
Asian Games gold medalists for China
Medalists at the 2017 Asian Winter Games
Competitors at the 2015 Winter Universiade